Green building (also known as green construction or sustainable building) refers to both a structure and the application of processes that are environmentally responsible and resource-efficient throughout a building's life-cycle: from planning to design, construction, operation, maintenance, renovation, and demolition. This requires close cooperation of the contractor, the architects, the engineers, and the client at all project stages. The Green Building practice expands and complements the classical building design concerns of economy, utility, durability, and comfort. Green building also refers to saving resources to the maximum extent, including energy saving, land saving, water saving, material saving, etc., during the whole life cycle of the building, protecting the environment and reducing pollution, providing people with healthy, comfortable and efficient use of space, and being in harmony with nature Buildings that live in harmony. Green building technology focuses on low consumption, high efficiency, economy, environmental protection, integration and optimization.’

Leadership in Energy and Environmental Design (LEED) is a set of rating systems for the design, construction, operation, and maintenance of green buildings which was developed by the U.S. Green Building Council. Other certificate systems that confirm the sustainability of buildings are the British BREEAM (Building Research Establishment Environmental Assessment Method) for buildings and large-scale developments or the DGNB System (Deutsche Gesellschaft für Nachhaltiges Bauen e.V.) which benchmarks the sustainability performance of buildings, indoor environments and districts. Currently, the World Green Building Council is conducting research on the effects of green buildings on the health and productivity of their users and is working with the World Bank to promote Green Buildings in Emerging Markets through EDGE (Excellence in Design for Greater Efficiencies) Market Transformation Program and certification. There are also other tools such as Green Star in Australia, Global Sustainability Assessment System (GSAS) used in the Middle East and the Green Building Index (GBI) predominantly used in Malaysia.

Building information modeling (BIM) is a process involving the generation and management of digital representations of physical and functional characteristics of places. Building information models (BIMs) are files (often but not always in proprietary formats and containing proprietary data) which can be extracted, exchanged, or networked to support decision-making regarding a building or other built asset. Current BIM software is used by individuals, businesses, and government agencies who plan, design, construct, operate and maintain diverse physical infrastructures, such as water, refuse, electricity, gas, communication utilities, roads, railways, bridges, ports, and tunnels.

Although new technologies are constantly being developed to complement current practices in creating greener structures, the common objective of green buildings is to reduce the overall impact of the built environment on human health and the natural environment by:
 Efficiently using energy, water, and other resources
 Protecting occupant health and improving employee productivity (see healthy building)
 Reducing waste, pollution, and environmental degradation

Natural building is a similar concept, usually on a smaller scale and focusing on the use of locally available natural materials. Other related topics include sustainable design and green architecture. Sustainability may be defined as meeting the needs of present generations without compromising the ability of future generations to meet their needs. Although some green building programs don't address the issue of retrofitting existing homes, others do, especially through public schemes for energy efficient refurbishment. Green construction principles can easily be applied to retrofit work as well as new construction.

A 2009 report by the U.S. General Services Administration found 12 sustainably-designed buildings that cost less to operate and have excellent energy performance. In addition, occupants were overall more satisfied with the building than those in typical commercial buildings. These are eco-friendly buildings.

Reducing environmental impact

Buildings represent a large part of energy, electricity, water and materials consumption. As of 2020, they account for 37% of global energy use and energy-related CO2 emissions, which the United Nations estimate contributed to 33% of overall worldwide emissions. Including the manufacturing of building materials, the global  emissions were 39%.  If new technologies in construction are not adopted during this time of rapid growth, emissions could double by 2050, according to the United Nations Environment Program.

Green building practices aim to reduce the environmental impact of building as the building sector has the greatest potential to deliver significant cuts in emissions at little or no cost. . General guidelines can be summarized as follows: Every building should be as small as possible. Avoid contributing to sprawl, even if the most energy-efficient, environmentally sound methods are used in design and construction. Bioclimatic design principles are able to reduce energy expenditure and by extension, carbon emissions. Bioclimatic design is a method of designing infrastructure within the context of their respective environment while using the surroundings to advantage whenever possible. This could be as simple as constructing a different shape for the building envelope or facing the building towards the south to maximize solar exposure for energy or lighting purposes. Given the limitations of city planned construction, bioclimatic principles may be employed on a lesser scale, however it is still an effective passive method to reduce environmental impact.

Buildings account for a large amount of land. The International Energy Agency released a publication that estimated that existing buildings are responsible for more than 40% of the world's total primary energy consumption and for 24% of global carbon dioxide emissions.

According to Global status report from the year 2016, buildings consume more than 30% of all produced energy. The report states that "Under a below 2°C trajectory, effective action to improve building energy efficiency could limit building final energy demand to just above current levels, meaning that the average energy intensity of the global building stock would decrease by more than 80% by 2050".

Goals of green building

The concept of sustainable development can be traced to the energy (especially fossil oil) crisis and environmental pollution concerns of the 1960s and 1970s.  The Rachel Carson book, "Silent Spring", published in 1962, is considered to be one of the first initial efforts to describe sustainable development as related to green building. The green building movement in the U.S. originated from the need and desire for more energy efficient and environmentally friendly construction practices. There are a number of motives for building green, including environmental, economic, and social benefits. However, modern sustainability initiatives call for an integrated and synergistic design to both new construction and in the retrofitting of existing structures. Also known as sustainable design, this approach integrates the building life-cycle with each green practice employed with a design-purpose to create a synergy among the practices used.

Green building brings together a vast array of practices, techniques, and skills to reduce and ultimately eliminate the impacts of buildings on the environment and human health. It often emphasizes taking advantage of renewable resources, e.g., using sunlight through passive solar, active solar, and photovoltaic equipment, and using plants and trees through green roofs, rain gardens, and reduction of rainwater run-off. Many other techniques are used, such as using low-impact building materials or using packed gravel or permeable concrete instead of conventional concrete or asphalt to enhance replenishment of groundwater.

While the practices or technologies employed in green building are constantly evolving and may differ from region to region, fundamental principles persist from which the method is derived: siting and structure design efficiency, energy efficiency, water efficiency, materials efficiency, indoor environmental quality enhancement, operations and maintenance optimization and waste and toxics reduction. The essence of green building is an optimization of one or more of these principles. Also, with the proper synergistic design, individual green building technologies may work together to produce a greater cumulative effect.

On the aesthetic side of green architecture or sustainable design is the philosophy of designing a building that is in harmony with the natural features and resources surrounding the site. There are several key steps in designing sustainable buildings: specify 'green' building materials from local sources, reduce loads, optimize systems, and generate on-site renewable energy.

Life cycle assessment
A life cycle assessment (LCA) can help avoid a narrow outlook on environmental, social and economic concerns by assessing a full range of impacts associated with all cradle-to-grave stages of a process: from extraction of raw materials through materials processing, manufacture, distribution, use, repair and maintenance, and disposal or recycling. Impacts taken into account include (among others) embodied energy, global warming potential, resource use, air pollution, water pollution, and waste.

In terms of green building, the last few years have seen a shift away from a prescriptive approach, which assumes that certain prescribed practices are better for the environment, toward the scientific evaluation of actual performance through LCA.

Although LCA is widely recognized as the best way to evaluate the environmental impacts of buildings (ISO 14040 provides a recognized LCA methodology), it is not yet a consistent requirement of green building rating systems and codes, despite the fact that embodied energy and other life cycle impacts are critical to the design of environmentally responsible buildings.

In North America, LCA is rewarded to some extent in the Green Globes rating system, and is part of the new American National Standard based on Green Globes, ANSI/GBI 01-2010: Green Building Protocol for Commercial Buildings. LCA is also included as a pilot credit in the LEED system, though a decision has not been made as to whether it will be incorporated fully into the next major revision. The state of California also included LCA as a voluntary measure in its 2010 draft Green Building Standards Code.

Although LCA is often perceived as overly complex and time-consuming for regular use by design professionals, research organizations such as BRE in the UK and the Athena Sustainable Materials Institute in North America are working to make it more accessible.

In the UK, the BRE Green Guide to Specifications offers ratings for 1,500 building materials based on LCA.

Siting and structure design efficiency

The foundation of any construction project is rooted in the concept and design stages. The concept stage, in fact, is one of the major steps in a project life cycle, as it has the largest impact on cost and performance. In designing environmentally optimal buildings, the objective is to minimize the total environmental impact associated with all life-cycle stages of the building project. However, building as a process is not as streamlined as an industrial process, and varies from one building to the other, never repeating itself identically. In addition, buildings are much more complex products, composed of a multitude of materials and components each constituting various design variables to be decided at the design stage. A variation of every design variable may affect the environment during all the building's relevant life-cycle stages.

Energy efficiency

Green buildings often include measures to reduce energy consumption – both the embodied energy required to extract, process, transport and install building materials and operating energy to provide services such as heating and power for equipment.

As high-performance buildings use less operating energy, embodied energy has assumed much greater importance – and may make up as much as 30% of the overall life cycle energy consumption.  Studies such as the U.S. LCI Database Project show buildings built primarily with wood will have a lower embodied energy than those built primarily with brick, concrete, or steel.

To reduce operating energy use, designers use details that reduce air leakage through the building envelope (the barrier between conditioned and unconditioned space). They also specify high-performance windows and extra insulation in walls, ceilings, and floors. Another strategy, passive solar building design, is often implemented in low-energy homes. Designers orient windows and walls and place awnings, porches, and trees to shade windows and roofs during the summer while maximizing solar gain in the winter. In addition, effective window placement (daylighting) can provide more natural light and lessen the need for electric lighting during the day. Solar water heating further reduces energy costs.

Onsite generation of renewable energy through solar power, wind power, hydro power, or biomass can significantly reduce the environmental impact of the building. Power generation is generally the most expensive feature to add to a building.

Energy efficiency for green buildings can be evaluated from either numerical or non-numerical methods. These include use of simulation modelling, analytical or statistical tools.

Water efficiency

Reducing water consumption and protecting water quality are key objectives in sustainable building. One critical issue of water consumption is that in many areas, the demands on the supplying aquifer exceed its ability to replenish itself. To the maximum extent feasible, facilities should increase their dependence on water that is collected, used, purified, and reused on-site. The protection and conservation of water throughout the life of a building may be accomplished by designing for dual plumbing that recycles water in toilet flushing or by using water for washing of the cars. Waste-water may be minimized by utilizing water conserving fixtures such as ultra-low flush toilets and low-flow shower heads. Bidets help eliminate the use of toilet paper, reducing sewer traffic and increasing possibilities of re-using water on-site. Point of use water treatment and heating improves both water quality and energy efficiency while reducing the amount of water in circulation. The use of non-sewage and greywater for on-site use such as site-irrigation will minimize demands on the local aquifer.

Large commercial buildings with water and energy efficiency can qualify for an LEED Certification. Philadelphia's Comcast Center is the tallest building in Philadelphia. It's also one of the tallest buildings in the USA that is LEED Certified. Their environmental engineering consists of a hybrid central chilled water system which cools floor-by-floor with steam instead of water. Burn's Mechanical set-up the entire renovation of the 58 story, 1.4 million square foot sky scraper.

Materials efficiency

Building materials typically considered 'green' include lumber( that has been certified to a third-party standard), rapidly renewable plant materials (like bamboo and straw), dimension stone, recycled stone, hempcrete, recycled metal (see: copper sustainability and recyclability), and other non-toxic, reusable, renewable, and/or recyclable products. Materials with lower embodied energy can be used in substitution to common building materials with high degrees of energy consumption and carbon/harmful emissions. For concrete a high performance self-healing version is available, however options with lower yields of pollutive waste entertain ideas of upcycling and congregate supplementing; replacing traditional concrete mixes with slag, production waste, and aggregates. Insulation also sees multiple angles for substitution. Commonly used fiberglass has competition from other eco-friendly, low energy embodying insulators with similar or higher R-values (per inch of thickness) at a competitive price. Sheep wool, cellulose, and ThermaCork perform more efficiently, however, use may be limited by transportation or installation costs.

Furthermore, embodied energy comparisons can help deduce the selection of building material and its efficiency. Wood production emits less  than concrete and steel if produced in a sustainable way just as steel can be produced more sustainably through improvements in technology (e.g. EAF) and energy recycling/carbon capture(an underutilized potential for systematically storing carbon in the built environment).

The EPA (Environmental Protection Agency) also suggests using recycled industrial goods, such as coal combustion products, foundry sand, and demolition debris in construction projects. Energy efficient building materials and appliances are promoted in the United States through energy rebate programs.

A 2022 report from the Boston Consulting Group found that, investments in developing greener forms of cement, iron, and steel lead to bigger greenhouse gas reductions compared with investments in electricity and aviation.

Indoor environmental quality enhancement

The Indoor Environmental Quality (IEQ) category in LEED standards, one of the five environmental categories, was created to provide comfort, well-being, and productivity of occupants. The LEED IEQ category addresses design and construction guidelines especially: indoor air quality (IAQ), thermal quality, and lighting quality.

Indoor Air Quality seeks to reduce volatile organic compounds, or VOCs, and other air impurities such as microbial contaminants. Buildings rely on a properly designed ventilation system (passively/naturally or mechanically powered) to provide adequate ventilation of cleaner air from outdoors or recirculated, filtered air as well as isolated operations (kitchens, dry cleaners, etc.) from other occupancies. During the design and construction process choosing construction materials and interior finish products with zero or low VOC emissions will improve IAQ. Most building materials and cleaning/maintenance products emit gases, some of them toxic, such as many VOCs including formaldehyde. These gases can have a detrimental impact on occupants' health, comfort, and productivity. Avoiding these products will increase a building's IEQ. LEED, HQE and Green Star contain specifications on use of low-emitting interior. Draft LEED 2012 is about to expand the scope of the involved products. BREEAM limits formaldehyde emissions, no other VOCs. MAS Certified Green is a registered trademark to delineate low VOC-emitting products in the marketplace. The MAS Certified Green Program ensures that any potentially hazardous chemicals released from manufactured products have been thoroughly tested and meet rigorous standards established by independent toxicologists to address recognized long-term health concerns. These IAQ standards have been adopted by and incorporated into the following programs: 
 The United States Green Building Council (USGBC) in their LEED rating system
 The California Department of Public Health (CDPH) in their section 01350 standards
 The Collaborative for High Performance Schools (CHPS) in their Best Practices Manual 
 The Business and Institutional Furniture Manufacturers Association (BIFMA) in their level® sustainability standard.

Also important to indoor air quality is the control of moisture accumulation (dampness) leading to mold growth and the presence of bacteria and viruses as well as dust mites and other organisms and microbiological concerns. Water intrusion through a building's envelope or water condensing on cold surfaces on the building's interior can enhance and sustain microbial growth. A well-insulated and tightly sealed envelope will reduce moisture problems but adequate ventilation is also necessary to eliminate moisture from sources indoors including human metabolic processes, cooking, bathing, cleaning, and other activities.

Personal temperature and airflow control over the HVAC system coupled with a properly designed building envelope will also aid in increasing a building's thermal quality. Creating a high performance luminous environment through the careful integration of daylight and electrical light sources will improve on the lighting quality and energy performance of a structure.

Solid wood products, particularly flooring, are often specified in environments where occupants are known to have allergies to dust or other particulates. Wood itself is considered to be hypo-allergenic and its smooth surfaces prevent the buildup of particles common in soft finishes like carpet. The Asthma and Allergy Foundation of America recommends hardwood, vinyl, linoleum tile or slate flooring instead of carpet. The use of wood products can also improve air quality by absorbing or releasing moisture in the air to moderate humidity.

Interactions among all the indoor components and the occupants together form the processes that determine the indoor air quality. Extensive investigation of such processes is the subject of indoor air scientific research and is well documented in the journal Indoor Air.

Operations and maintenance optimization
No matter how sustainable a building may have been in its design and construction, it can only remain so if it is operated responsibly and maintained properly. Ensuring operations and maintenance(O&M) personnel are part of the project's planning and development process will help retain the green criteria designed at the onset of the project. Every aspect of green building is integrated into the O&M phase of a building's life. The addition of new green technologies also falls on the O&M staff. Although the goal of waste reduction may be applied during the design, construction and demolition phases of a building's life-cycle, it is in the O&M phase that green practices such as recycling and air quality enhancement take place. O&M staff should aim to establish best practices in energy efficiency, resource conservation, ecologically sensitive products and other sustainable practices. Education of building operators and occupants is key to effective implementation of sustainable strategies in O&M services.

Waste reduction
Green architecture also seeks to reduce waste of energy, water and materials used during construction. For example, in California nearly 60% of the state's waste comes from commercial buildings During the construction phase, one goal should be to reduce the amount of material going to landfills. Well-designed buildings also help reduce the amount of waste generated by the occupants as well, by providing on-site solutions such as compost bins to reduce matter going to landfills.

To reduce the amount of wood that goes to landfill, Neutral Alliance (a coalition of government, NGOs and the forest industry) created the website dontwastewood.com. The site includes a variety of resources for regulators, municipalities, developers, contractors, owner/operators and individuals/homeowners looking for information on wood recycling.

When buildings reach the end of their useful life, they are typically demolished and hauled to landfills. Deconstruction is a method of harvesting what is commonly considered "waste" and reclaiming it into useful building material. Extending the useful life of a structure also reduces waste – building materials such as wood that are light and easy to work with make renovations easier.

To reduce the impact on wells or water treatment plants, several options exist. "Greywater", wastewater from sources such as dishwashing or washing machines, can be used for subsurface irrigation, or if treated, for non-potable purposes, e.g., to flush toilets and wash cars. Rainwater collectors are used for similar purposes.

Centralized wastewater treatment systems can be costly and use a lot of energy. An alternative to this process is converting waste and wastewater into fertilizer, which avoids these costs and shows other benefits. By collecting human waste at the source and running it to a semi-centralized biogas plant with other biological waste, liquid fertilizer can be produced. This concept was demonstrated by a settlement in Lübeck Germany in the late 1990s. Practices like these provide soil with organic nutrients and create carbon sinks that remove carbon dioxide from the atmosphere, offsetting greenhouse gas emission. Producing artificial fertilizer is also more costly in energy than this process.

Reduce impact onto electricity network
Electricity networks are built based on peak demand (another name is peak load). Peak demand is measured in the units of watts (W). It shows how fast electrical energy is consumed. Residential electricity is often charged on electrical energy (kilowatt hour, kWh). Green buildings or sustainable buildings are often capable of saving electrical energy but not necessarily reducing peak demand.

When sustainable building features are designed, constructed and operated efficiently, peak demand can be reduced so that there is less desire for electricity network expansion and there is less impact onto carbon emission and climate change. These sustainable features can be good orientation, sufficient indoor thermal mass, good insulation, photovoltaic panels, thermal or electrical energy storage systems, smart building (home) energy management systems.

Cost and payoff
The most criticized issue about constructing environmentally friendly buildings is the price. Photovoltaics, new appliances, and modern technologies tend to cost more money. Most green buildings cost a premium of <2%, but yield 10 times as much over the entire life of the building. In regards to the financial benefits of green building, "Over 20 years, the financial payback typically exceeds the additional cost of greening by a factor of 4-6 times. And broader benefits, such as reductions in greenhouse gases (GHGs) and other pollutants have large positive impacts on surrounding communities and on the planet." The stigma is between the knowledge of up-front cost vs. life-cycle cost. The savings in money come from more efficient use of utilities which result in decreased energy bills. It is projected that different sectors could save $130 billion on energy bills. Also, higher worker or student productivity can be factored into savings and cost deductions.

Numerous studies have shown the measurable benefit of green building initiatives on worker productivity. In general it has been found that, "there is a direct correlation between increased productivity and employees who love being in their work space." Specifically, worker productivity can be significantly impacted by certain aspects of green building design such as improved lighting, reduction of pollutants, advanced ventilation systems and the use of non-toxic building materials. In "The Business Case for Green Building", the U.S. Green Building Council gives another specific example of how commercial energy retrofits increase worker health and thus productivity, "People in the U.S. spend about 90% of their time indoors. EPA studies indicate indoor levels of pollutants may be up to ten times higher than outdoor levels. LEED-certified buildings are designed to have healthier, cleaner indoor environmental quality, which means health benefits for occupants."

Studies have shown over a 20-year life period, some green buildings have yielded $53 to $71 per square foot back on investment. Confirming the rentability of green building investments, further studies of the commercial real estate market have found that LEED and Energy Star certified buildings achieve significantly higher rents, sale prices and occupancy rates as well as lower capitalization rates potentially reflecting lower investment risk.

Regulation and operation
As a result of the increased interest in green building concepts and practices, a number of organizations have developed standards, codes and rating systems for use by government regulators, building professionals and consumers. In some cases, codes are written so local governments can adopt them as bylaws to reduce the local environmental impact of buildings.

Green building rating systems such as BREEAM (United Kingdom), LEED (United States and Canada), DGNB (Germany), CASBEE (Japan), and VERDEGBCe (Spain), GRIHA (India) help consumers determine a structure's level of environmental performance. They award credits for optional building features that support green design in categories such as location and maintenance of building site, conservation of water, energy, and building materials, and occupant comfort and health. The number of credits generally determines the level of achievement.

Green building codes and standards, such as the International Code Council's draft International Green Construction Code, are sets of rules created by standards development organizations that establish minimum requirements for elements of green building such as materials or heating and cooling.

Some of the major building environmental assessment tools currently in use include:
United States: International Green Construction Code (IGCC)

Green neighborhoods and villages 

At the beginning of the 21st century, efforts were made to implement the principles of green building, not only for individual buildings, but also for neighborhoods and villages. The intent is to create zero energy neighborhoods and villages, which means they're going to create all the energy on their own. They will also reuse waste, implements sustainable transportation, and produce their own food.

International frameworks and assessment tools
IPCC Fourth Assessment Report

Climate Change 2007, the Fourth Assessment Report (AR4) of the United Nations Intergovernmental Panel on Climate Change (IPCC), is the fourth in a series of such reports. The IPCC was established by the World Meteorological Organization (WMO) and the United Nations Environment Programme (UNEP) to assess scientific, technical and socio-economic information concerning climate change, its potential effects and options for adaptation and mitigation.

UNEP and Climate change

United Nations Environment Program UNEP works to facilitate the transition to low-carbon societies, support climate proofing efforts, improve understanding of climate change science, and raise public awareness about this global challenge.

GHG Indicator

The Greenhouse Gas Indicator: UNEP Guidelines for Calculating Greenhouse Gas Emissions for Businesses and Non-Commercial Organizations

Agenda 21

Agenda 21 is a programme run by the United Nations (UN) related to sustainable development. It is a comprehensive blueprint of action to be taken globally, nationally and locally by organizations of the UN, governments, and major groups in every area in which humans impact on the environment. The number 21 refers to the 21st century.

FIDIC's PSM

The International Federation of Consulting Engineers (FIDIC) Project Sustainability Management Guidelines were created in order to assist project engineers and other stakeholders in setting sustainable development goals for their projects that are recognized and accepted by as being in the interests of society as a whole. The process is also intended to allow the alignment of project goals with local conditions and priorities and to assist those involved in managing projects to measure and verify their progress.

The Project Sustainability Management Guidelines are structured with Themes and Sub-Themes under the three main sustainability headings of Social, Environmental and Economic. For each individual Sub-Theme a core project indicator is defined along with guidance as to the relevance of that issue in the context of an individual
project.

The Sustainability Reporting Framework provides guidance for organizations to use as the basis for disclosure about their sustainability performance, and also provides stakeholders a universally applicable, comparable framework in which to understand disclosed information.

The Reporting Framework contains the core product of the Sustainability Reporting Guidelines, as well as Protocols and Sector Supplements.
The Guidelines are used as the basis for all reporting. They are the foundation upon which all other reporting guidance is based, and outline core content for reporting that is broadly relevant to all organizations regardless of size, sector, or location. The Guidelines contain principles and guidance as well as standard disclosures – including indicators – to outline a disclosure framework that organizations can voluntarily, flexibly, and incrementally, adopt.

Protocols underpin each indicator in the Guidelines and include definitions for key terms in the indicator, compilation methodologies, intended scope of the indicator, and other technical references.

Sector Supplements respond to the limits of a one-size-fits-all approach. Sector Supplements complement the use of the core Guidelines by capturing the unique set of sustainability issues faced by different sectors such as mining, automotive, banking, public agencies and others.

IPD Environment Code

The IPD Environment Code was launched in February 2008. The Code is intended as a good practice global standard for measuring the environmental performance of corporate buildings. Its aim is to accurately measure and manage the environmental impacts of corporate buildings and enable property executives to generate high quality, comparable performance information about their
buildings anywhere in the world. The Code covers a wide range of building types (from offices to airports) and aims to inform and support
the following;
 Creating an environmental strategy
 Inputting to real estate strategy
 Communicating a commitment to environmental improvement
 Creating performance targets
 Environmental improvement plans
 Performance assessment and measurement
 Life cycle assessments
 Acquisition and disposal of buildings
 Supplier management
 Information systems and data population
 Compliance with regulations
 Team and personal objectives

IPD estimate that it will take approximately three years to gather significant data to develop a robust set of baseline data that could be used across a typical corporate estate.

ISO 21931 

ISO/TS 21931:2006, Sustainability in building construction—Framework for methods of assessment for environmental performance of construction works—Part 1: Buildings, is intended to provide a general framework for improving the quality and comparability of methods for assessing the environmental performance of buildings. It identifies and describes issues to be taken into account when using methods for the assessment of environmental performance for new or existing building properties in the design, construction, operation, refurbishment and deconstruction stages. It is not an assessment system in itself but is intended be used in conjunction with, and following the principles set out in, the ISO 14000 series of standards.

Development history 

 In the 1960s, American architect Paul Soleri proposed a new concept of ecological architecture.
 In 1969, American architect Ian McHarg wrote the book "Design Integrates Nature", which marked the official birth of ecological architecture.
 In the 1970s, the energy crisis caused various building energy-saving technologies such as solar energy, geothermal energy, and wind energy to emerge, and energy-saving buildings became the forerunner of building development.
 In 1980, the World Conservation Organization put forward the slogan "sustainable development" for the first time. At the same time, the energy-saving building system was gradually improved, and it was widely used in developed countries such as Germany, Britain, France and Canada.
 In 1987, the United Nations Environment Program published the "Our Common Future" report, which established the idea of sustainable development.
 In 1990, the world's first green building standard was released in the UK.
 In 1992, because the "United Nations Conference on Environment and Development" promoted the idea of sustainable development, green buildings gradually became the direction of development.
 In 1993, the United States created the Green Building Association.
 In 1996, Hong Kong introduced green building standards.
 In 1999, Taiwan introduced green building standards.
 In 2000, Canada introduced green building standards.
 In 2005, Singapore initiated the "BCA Green Building Mark"
 In 2015, according to the Berkeley National Laboratory, China implemented the "Green Building Evaluation Standards"
 In 2021, the first, both low-cost and sustainable 3D printed house made out of a clay-mixture was completed

Green building by country
Green building in Australia
Green building in Bangladesh
Green building in Germany
Green building in Israel
Green building in South Africa
Green building in the United Kingdom
Green building in India
Green building in the United States

See also

 Alternative natural materials
 Arcology — high density ecological structures
 Autonomous building
 Biophilic design
 Building
 Building insulation
 Centre for Interactive Research on Sustainability
 Deconstruction (building)
 Eco hotel
 Environmental planning
 Geo-exchange
 Green architecture
 Green building and wood
 Green Building Council
 Green home
 Green library
 Green technology
 Glass in green buildings
 Healthy building
 Leadership in Energy and Environmental Design
 List of low-energy building techniques
 Low-energy house
 National Green Building Standard
 Natural building
 Sustainable city
 Sustainable habitat
 Tropical green building
 World Green Building Council
 Zero-energy building
 Zero heating building

References

External links

Sustainable Architecture at the Open Directory Project
Prochorskaite A, Couch C, Malys N, Maliene V (2016) Housing Stakeholder Preferences for the "Soft" Features of Sustainable and Healthy Housing Design in the UK.
 
 The Sustainable house handbook : how to plan and build an affordable, energy-efficient and waterwise home for the future / Josh Byrne.  - ISBN 9781743795828 . - Richmond, Vic. : Hardie Grant Books, 2020.
 Sustainable house / Michael Mobbs. - 2nd ed. - Sydney, NSW : UNSW Press, 2010. - ISBN 978-1-920705-52-7
 Nationwide House Energy Rating Scheme (NatHERS)
 Renew : leading in sustainability
 Housing Industry Association. GreenSmart Awards.
 National Australian Built Environment Rating System (NaBERS)

Sustainable building
Building engineering
Sustainable architecture
Low-energy building
Buildings and structures by type
Sustainable urban planning
Sustainability
Sustainable development
Sustainable design
Building